HD 89571 (HR 4062) is a binary star located in the northern circumpolar constellation Camelopardalis. It is faintly visible to the naked eye with a combined apparent magnitude of 5.51 and is estimated to be 142 light years away from the Solar System.

The primary has a stellar classification of A9 V, indicating that it is an ordinary A-type main-sequence star. David S. Evans gave it a slightly warmer class of A6 V while Cowley et al. classified it as F0 IV, indicating a F-type subgiant.

References

A-type main-sequence stars
Binary stars
Camelopardalis (constellation)
K-type main-sequence stars
BD+84 00234
089571
051384
4062